Sweden participated in the inaugural Paralympic Games in 1960 in Rome. The 1960 Paralympics, now considered to have been the first Paralympic Games, were initially known as the ninth Stoke Mandeville Games. The Stoke Mandeville Games were founded for athletes with disabilities in Great Britain in 1948.

Sweden fielded 3 competitors, all in archery. They paid for their own trip. Sweden did not win any medals at the 1960 Games.

See also

 Sweden at the 1960 Summer Olympics

References

Nations at the 1960 Summer Paralympics
1960
Paralympics